Thomas Mann (born December 15, 1949) is an American politician in the state of Iowa.

Mann was born in Haywood County, Tennessee. He attended Tennessee State University and the University of Iowa and is a lawyer. A Democrat, he served in the Iowa State Senate from 1983 to 1991 (43rd district). He was the first African-American elected to the Iowa Senate.

References

1949 births
Living people
People from Haywood County, Tennessee
Tennessee State University alumni
University of Iowa alumni
Iowa lawyers
Democratic Party Iowa state senators
African-American state legislators in Iowa
21st-century African-American people
20th-century African-American people